Texas State Highway Loop 463 (Loop 463) is a state highway loop in the city of Victoria in the U.S. state of Texas. The highway composes the eastern segment of the Zac Lentz Parkway; the western section carries  US 77.

Route description
The Loop 463 designation officially begins at an interchange with Future I-69/US 59; however, state maintenance of the roadway continues along Burroughsville Road for approximately 500 feet to the Victoria city limits. From this interchange, the roadway travels to the northwest, crossing Lone Tree Road at an at-grade intersection before meeting Future Bus. I-69/Bus. US 59 at a folded diamond interchange. It then has two at-grade crossings, at Airline Road and Ben Jorden Street, before turning into a freeway-grade roadway. Loop 463 has interchanges at Mockingbird Lane and Salem Road before turning due west. The Loop 463 designation ends at an interchange with Navarro Street, which carries  Bus. US 77 into downtown Victoria and northbound  US 77 towards Hallettsville. Zac Lentz Parkway continues past this point carrying southbound US 77.

History
Loop 463 was first designated on May 23, 1968. The designation was truncated to its current routing on April 25, 2002, when US 77 was rerouted around the west and north sides of Victoria along the parkway. The segment that was removed along Navarro Street became part of Bus. US 77.

The northern freeway segment of Loop 463 was completed in 2013 after two years of construction. The main lanes were constructed and interchanges were added at several junctions.

Major intersections

References

463
Transportation in Victoria County, Texas